Setosipennula is a genus of moths in the family Pterophoridae containing only one species, Setosipennula viettei, which is known from Madagascar.

References

Oidaematophorini
Moths of Madagascar
Moths of Africa
Monotypic moth genera